Ulmus 'Pendula' may refer to:

Ulmus americana 'Pendula'
Ulmus minor 'Pendula'
Ulmus pumila 'Pendula'